Qazi Deh is a village in Badakhshan Province in north-eastern Afghanistan. It lies on the left bank of the Panj River, 20 km from Ishkashim.

Qazi Deh is the trailhead for a 5-day round trip trek up a narrow side valley to the base camp for Noshaq.

The village is inhabited by Wakhi people.  The population of the village (2003) is 548.

See also
Badakhshan Province

References

External links
Satellite map at Maplandia.com

Populated places in Badakhshan Province